The Isles-class trawlers were a class of naval trawler used by the Royal Navy, Royal Canadian Navy and Royal New Zealand Navy during World War II.

The type comprised 197 vessels built between 1939 and 1945 in the nearly identical Isles,  and  classes. Generally similar to the s of 1916–1918, though somewhat larger, they were mainly used on minesweeping and harbour defence duties. Most were armed with one 12-pounder gun (76 mm) and three or four 20 mm Oerlikon AA guns with 30 depth charges. In the Dance class a 4-inch AA gun (102 mm) was fitted in place of the 12 pdr, and there were six 20 mm Oerlikons in Annet, Bressay, Damsay, Fiaray, Foulness and Lindisfarne. Four of the trawlers were given "bird" names when converted to controlled minelayers in 1943–44: Blackbird (M15), Dabchick (M22), Stonechat (M25) and Whitethroat (M03). A total of 23 of these trawlers were lost during the war. Six trawlers were loaned to Canada in 1942-45 and five to Norway in 1943-45.

Postwar, 17 of the trawlers were disarmed as wreck disposal vessels: Bardsey (DV13), Bern (DV4), Caldy (DV5) Coll (DV6), Earraid (DV7), Fetlar (DV8), Flatholm (DV9), Graemsay (DV10), Lindisfarne (DV11), Lundy (DV12), Neave (DV14), Scalpay (DV15), Skomer (DV16), Steepholm (DV17), Switha (DV18), Tiree (DV19), and Trondra (DV20). At least five were employed as danlayers (laying and retrieving dan buoys during minesweeping operations): Imersay (J422), Sandray (J424), Shillay (J426), Sursay (J427) and Tocogay (J451). After decommissioning, Switha and Coll were converted to oil tank cleaning vessels for dockyard service in 1949-50.

By 1949 there remained in service of this type 31 trawlers and four controlled minelayers in the Royal Navy, one controlled minelayer in the Royal Canadian Navy, and four trawlers in the Royal New Zealand Navy. An additional 16 were in service in the Italian Navy and six in the Portuguese Navy. Most of the surviving Royal Navy examples were discarded in the 1950s, but a few remained until the 1960s. Two acquired postwar by the Federal German Navy remained in service as training vessels well into the 1970s, with one, Trave (ex-Dochet), resold to Turkey for further service in 1977.

Builders
Ardrossan Dockyard Company, Ardrossan, UK
George Brown & Company (Marine) Ltd., Greenock, UK
Cochrane & Sons, Ltd., Selby, UK
Collingwood Shipyards, Collingwood, Ontario, Canada
Cook, Welton & Gemmell, Beverley, UK
John Crown & Sons Ltd., Sunderland, UK
G.T. Davie & Sons, Lauzon, Quebec, Canada
Ferguson Bros. Ltd., Port Glasgow, UK
Fleming & Ferguson, Paisley, UK
Goole Shipbuilding & Repair Company, Goole, UK
Alexander Hall & Company, Aberdeen, UK
Hall, Russell & Company, Aberdeen, UK
A. & J. Inglis, Glasgow, UK
Kingston Shipyards, Kingston, Ontario
John Lewis & Sons, Aberdeen, UK
Midland Shipyards, Midland, Ontario, Canada
Henry Robb Ltd., Leith, UK
Smiths Dock Company Ltd., South Bank-on-Tees, UK

Ships in class

Royal Navy

The following 21 trawlers may be described as comprising the Repeat Isles class:

Royal Canadian Navy

Royal New Zealand Navy

See also
 
 
 
 
 
 Type 139 patrol trawler
 Trawlers of the Royal Navy
 Minesweepers of the Royal New Zealand Navy

References

 
 

 

 
Mine warfare vessel classes
Minesweepers of the Italian Navy
Minesweepers of the Portuguese Navy
Minesweepers of the Royal Navy
Ship classes of the Royal Navy
World War II minesweepers of the United Kingdom
 
World War II minesweepers of New Zealand